Jacques-Alaixys Romao (born 18 January 1984), commonly known as Alaixys Romao, is a professional footballer who plays as a midfielder for Super League Greece club Ionikos, for which he is captain. Born in France, he represents Togo at international level.

Club career

Early career
Romao started his professional career with Toulouse FC, but only managed appearances for the B team in 2004–05 and was then transferred for free to Louhans-Cuiseaux in the Championnat National, the French third tier.

Grenoble
In the 2007–08 season, he was traded for free to Grenoble and his career took off. A solid and rugged defensive midfielder, Romao proved a valuable asset for Grenoble. His first season with the club saw him appear 30 times in Ligue 2 with 2 goals and 10 yellow cards topped with a promotion to Ligue 1.

In 2008–09, he made 37 appearances, 32 of them as a starter in Ligue 1 and managed to avoid the drop. The next season, Romao made 29 appearances for Grenoble and 2 assists. However, Grenoble was not able to avoid the drop this time and was relegated.

Lorient
Romao was then signed by FC Lorient in July 2010 for a reported fee of 8,000.00 GBP. In the 2010–11 season, his first with FC Lorient, Romao made 33 appearances in Ligue 1 with a goal and 2 assists, 2 appearances in the Ligue Cup and 2 appearances in the French Cup competition with 1 goal. Romao made another 32 appearances as a starter in the 2011–12 season with a goal and an assist, but also with 11 yellow cards and 2 red cards.

Marseille
On 31 January 2013, Romao was signed by Marseille. According to L'Équipe, the transfer fee paid to Lorient was €2 million and the duration of Romao's contract was 3.5 years. At the end of his contract in the summer of 2016, he was released by the club, having made 127 appearances in all competitions, scoring 4 goals.

Olympiacos
On 31 August 2016, Romao joined Greek club Olympiacos, signing a two-year contract with the option of another year. At the end of the season, he helped the club to win the 7th consecutive Super League title.

On 16 August 2017, he scored his first international goal with the club, as Olympiacos came from behind, in first half, to win 2–1 against HNK Rijeka in added time for the 1st leg of UEFA Champions League play-offs. On 16 September 2017, he signed a new contract with the club, which would keep him at the club till the summer of 2020.

Reims
On 24 July 2018, Romao joined French club Stade de Reims, signing a two-year deal with the option of another year.

Guingamp
The 36-year-old midfielder has teamed up with the Ligue 2 outfit following the expiration of his contract at Stade Auguste-Delaune. Togo international Alaixys Romao has been snapped up by French Ligue 2 outfit Guingamp on a free transfer having seen out his contract at Reims.

Ionikos
On 30 June 2021, the converted center-back midfielder Guingamp Alaixys Romao has signed a year with Greek club Ionikos. The Togolese was free as no agreement could be found on the contours of an extension in Brittany.

International career
The French-born player has featured for the French under-18 national team, but is a member of the Togolese national team since 2005, for which he was called up to the 2006 World Cup.

In 2013 he played in all matches at 2013 Africa Cup of Nations where his team reached the quarter-finals. 

In March 2019, Romao was called up for the first time since October 2017, being selected for the decisive 2019 Africa Cup of Nations qualification match against Benin.

References

External links
 
 
 

1984 births
Living people
People from L'Haÿ-les-Roses
Footballers from Val-de-Marne
French sportspeople of Togolese descent
Citizens of Togo through descent
Togolese people of French descent
Association football midfielders
Togolese footballers
French footballers
Togo international footballers
2006 FIFA World Cup players
Togolese expatriate footballers
Togolese expatriate sportspeople in Greece
Expatriate footballers in Greece
French expatriate footballers
French expatriate sportspeople in Greece
Ligue 1 players
Championnat National players
Ligue 2 players
Super League Greece players
Louhans-Cuiseaux FC players
Grenoble Foot 38 players
FC Lorient players
Olympique de Marseille players
Olympiacos F.C. players
Stade de Reims players
En Avant Guingamp players
Ionikos F.C. players
2006 Africa Cup of Nations players
2010 Africa Cup of Nations players
2013 Africa Cup of Nations players
2017 Africa Cup of Nations players